Bestway Cement Limited is a Pakistani building materials company which is a subsidiary of British company Bestway Group. The company is based in Islamabad, Pakistan.

It was founded in 1993 and is listed on the Pakistan Stock Exchange.

History
In 1995, Bestway Group Chief Executive Zameer Choudrey initiated the Group's business diversification strategy and was appointed Chief Executive of Bestway Cement.

The Group built its first cement plant in Hattar, in the Khyber Pakhtoonkhwa province of Pakistan in 1995. This was an initial investment of US$120 million and led to the creation of 800 jobs. Civil works started in January 1996 and the Kiln was fired in April 1998. In 2002 the plant's capacity was further enhanced to 1.3 million TPA at a cost of US$20 million.

In February 2004 the company set up its second plant with a 1.8 million TPA capacity in Chakwal in the Province of Punjab, Pakistan with a total investment of US$140 million and led to the creation of 900 jobs.

In September 2005, Bestway bid for 85.29 percent equity of Mustehkam Cement Limited under the Privatization Scheme and acquired the company for $70.0 million. The deal was spearheaded by Choudrey spearheaded the Group's US$70 million acquisition of its third cement plant Mustehkam Cement as part of the Government's Privatisation Programme. In the post acquisition period the Group has invested in excess of US$50 million.

In October 2007 the company was granted an export license by the Bureau of Indian Standards.

Subsequently similar export licenses were granted for Dubai; South Africa; Sri Lanka and Turkey.

In June 2008 the Group's fourth cement plant with a 1.8 million TPA capacity went into commercial production adjacent to the existing site in Chakwal at a cost of US$180 million and 500 new jobs were added.

In November 2013, the Mustehkam Cement was merged with Bestway Cement.

In July 2014 the company acquired Lafarge's 75.86% stake in Lafarge Pakistan Cement Ltd for an enterprise value of US$329 million (€244 million). Lafarge Pakistan Cement Ltd operates an integrated cement plant in the north of Pakistan, close to Islamabad. The company also acquired another 12.07% shares through a public offer, taking its shareholding in Lafarge Pakistan to 87.93%.

In April 2015, Choudrey announced plans to invest US$30 million in Pakcem (formerly Lafarge Pakistan) plant. As part of the investment programme, Bestway would establish an environmentally friendly WHRP Plant at Pakcem.

In July 2015, the company inaugurated two WHRP Plants (6 MW and 7.5 MW) at its Hattar and Farooqia
plants in KPK Province of Pakistan.

In March 2017 the company announced plans to set up its third cement plant in Haripur KPK Province. The brownfield plant will have a daily production capacity of 6,000 tons of clinker per day.

In June 2018, the company expanded its capacity by 1.8 million tons.

In May 2021, Bestway Cement announced it will establish greenfield plant in Mianwali having capacity of 7,200 tons. It will include a 9MW waste heat recovery plant.

In June 2021 the company commissioned its first 14.3MW captive solar power unit at its integrated cement plant at Farooqia, Khyber Pakhtunkhwa. The unit is part of a 50MW project deal that is planned to install solar units at the cement producer's plant at Farooqia, Chakwal, Kallar Kahar and Hattar in Pakistan.

References

Companies listed on the Pakistan Stock Exchange
Pakistani subsidiaries of foreign companies
Cement companies of Pakistan
Companies established in 1993
1993 establishments in Pakistan
Companies based in Islamabad